Daina may refer to:

Daina (Latvia), Latvian folksong
Daina (Lithuania), Lithuanian folksong
Daina (name), Latvian and Lithuanian female given name
Daina (organization), Lithuanian cultural organization that functioned in (1899–1915)

Other 
Daina (film), a 1984 Indian Bodo documentary film
Daina (software)